Kentriodon is an extinct genus of toothed whale related to modern-day dolphins. Fossils have been found in North America, Europe and Japan. Several species have been described.

Description 
 
Kentriodon was the most diverse of all the kentriodontids, which are represented by seventeen described genera. These were small to medium-sized odontocetes with largely symmetrical skulls, and thought likely to include ancestors of some modern species. Kentriodon is also the oldest described kentriodontid genus, reported from the Late Oligocene to the Middle Miocene.

Kentriodontines ate small fish and other nectonic organisms; they are thought to have been active echolocators, and might have formed pods. The diversity, morphology and distribution of fossils appear parallel to some modern species.

Species 
 Kentriodon pernix Kellogg, 1927 (type)
 Kentriodon fuchsii (Brandt, 1873)
 Kentriodon hobetsu Ichishima, 1995
 Kentriodon obscurus (Kellogg, 1931)
 Kentriodon schneideri Whitmore and Kaltenbach, 2008
 Kentriodon diusinus Salinas-Márquez, Barnes, Flores-Trujillo, Aranda-Manteca, 2014 
 Kentriodon hoepfneri Kazár & Hampe, 2014
 Kentriodon nakajimai Kimura & Hasegawa, 2019
 Kentriodon sugawarai Guo & Kohno, 2021

See also 

 Evolution of cetaceans

References

Further reading 
 Encyclopedia of Marine Mammals, Perrin, Würsig, Thewissen
 The Evolution of Whales, Adapted from National Geographic, November 2001

Prehistoric toothed whales
Prehistoric cetacean genera
Oligocene cetaceans
Miocene cetaceans
Miocene mammals of Europe
Oligocene mammals of Europe
Miocene mammals of Asia
Oligocene mammals of Asia
Miocene mammals of North America
Oligocene mammals of North America
Miocene mammals of South America
Neogene Argentina
Fossils of Argentina
Neogene Peru
Fossils of Peru
Fossil taxa described in 1927